Edward Thomas Foley (21 December 1791 – 30 March 1846), of Stoke Edith, Herefordshire, was an English Tory (and later Conservative) politician.

He was the eldest son of Hon. Edward Foley and his wife Eliza Maria Foley Hodgetts and elder brother of John Hodgetts Hodgetts-Foley and inherited the Stoke Edith estate from his father in 1803. He was educated at Brasenose College, Oxford (1809) and appointed High Sheriff of Herefordshire for 1815–16.

Foley was one of the Members of Parliament (MP) for Ludgershall from 1826 to 1832 and for Herefordshire from 1832 to 1841.

Family  
He married in 1832 Lady Emily Graham daughter of James Graham, 3rd Duke of Montrose, but died childless in 1846. His widow survived him until 1901. Foley's will enabled his widow to dispose of the Stoke Edith estate as she wished, but she declined to use that power, enabling her husband's great nephew Paul Henry Foley of Prestwood, Staffordshire, the grandson of John Hodgetts Hodgetts-Foley, to inherit the estate.

See also 
 Foley v Hill

References

External links 
 

1791 births
1846 deaths
People from Herefordshire
Alumni of Brasenose College, Oxford
Tory MPs (pre-1834)
Conservative Party (UK) MPs for English constituencies
UK MPs 1826–1830
UK MPs 1830–1831
UK MPs 1831–1832
UK MPs 1832–1835
UK MPs 1835–1837
UK MPs 1837–1841
High Sheriffs of Herefordshire
Edward Thomas